Governor Morehead may refer to:

Charles S. Morehead (1802–1868), 20th Governor of Kentucky
James Turner Morehead (Kentucky politician) (1797–1854), 12th Governor of Kentucky
John H. Morehead (1861–1942), 17th Governor of Nebraska
John Motley Morehead (1796–1866), 29th Governor of North Carolina
William Ambrose Morehead (1805–1863), Governor of Madras from 1860 to 1861